Blue Lab Beats are a London-based music duo composed of NK-OK (Namali Kwaten) and Mr DM (David Mrakpor).

Blue Lab Beats were nominated for Best Jazz Act at MOBO Awards 2021, nominated at Jazz FM Awards 2022 in three categories including Album of the Year and UK Jazz Act of the Year and won a Grammy award in 2022 for their production on Angelique Kidjo's Mother Nature LP (Best Global Music Album).

Members
 David Mrakpor – guitar, bass, keyboards 
 Namali Kwaten – drum programming, percussion, production

Discography

As main artist

Studio albums
 Xover (2018)
 Voyage (2019)
 Motherland Journey (2022)

Singles
 Keep Moving (2017) 
 Sam Cooke & Marvin Gaye (2017) 
 The Idea (2017) 
 Pineapple (2017) 
 Dome (2017) 
 Oooo Lala (2018) 
 My Dream (2018) 
 Say Yes (2018) 
 Hi There (2019) 
 Lipstick (2019) 
 Stand Up (2019) 
 On & On (2019) 
 Next (wake up) (2019) 
 Montara (2020) 
 Blow you Away (Deliah) (2021) 
 Sensual Loving (2021) 
 Dat It (2021) 
 Lables (2021) 
 Motherland Journey (2021) 
 Gotta Go Fast (2022)

EPs
 Blue Skies (2016)
 Freedom (2017)
 Vibe Central (2019)
 We will Rise (2021)

As featured artist

Singles
 Let Me In (2021) 
 Skybox (2022) 
 Fleur Bleu (2022) 

Songs
 Made us better

References

English jazz ensembles